Valerianella dentata is a species of flowering plant, belonging to the genus Valerianella.

It has cosmopolitan distribution.

References

External links

dentata
Flora of Europe